Qaravəlilər (also, Qaravəllilər and Qaravəllər) is a village in the Gadabay Rayon of Azerbaijan.  The village forms part of the municipality of Hacılar.

References 

Populated places in Gadabay District